Bubbler is a ZX Spectrum video game developed and published by Ultimate Play the Game in 1987. It was Ultimate's final title for 8-bit home computers before evolving into Rare. The game is an isometric platform game in the style of Marble Madness (1984).

Development
A Commodore 64 version was outsourced to Lynsoft but the release was cancelled as Ultimate thought the game was running too slowly.

Reception 
Crash magazine reviewer Ricky disliked the impreciseness of the controls. Sinclair User were more impressed by the game; they did not consider it to be one of Ultimate's most original game or particularly well presented but thought it was very addictive. It was awarded a 5 star rating.

References

External links 
 Bubbler at Ultimate Wurlde

 Bubbler review at CRASH magazine
 unreleased Bubbler for Commodore 64

1987 video games
Rare (company) games
Amstrad CPC games
Marble games
MSX games
ZX Spectrum games
Cancelled Commodore 64 games
Video games with isometric graphics
Video games developed in the United Kingdom